The Crossing is an album by guitarist Sanjay Mishra.  His first album, it was released in 1993.

Track listing
All songs written by Sanjay Mishra
"Country and Eastern"
"Takes Two To"
"Rendezvous"
"Lullaby"
"City of Joy"
"The Crossing"
"Manali"
"Cantico"
"Attack of The Killer Bees"
"By Twilight"
"Mirage"
"Invocation"

Personnel
Sanjay Mishra – MIDI nylon string electric guitar with photon MIDI converter
Broto Roy – percussion
Grover Tigue – electric bass
Meg Kimmel, Aniko Debreceny – flutes on tracks 2 and 11
Malashri Prasad – sampled voice on tracks 6 and 10

References

1993 albums
Sanjay Mishra albums